Cameron Highway is an arterial road in South Australia, connecting Alawoona on the Karoonda Highway to Paruna on the Browns Well Highway. It follows part of the former Barmera railway line.

The Cameron Highway was named around 2008 after either Archie Cameron (a local state and Federal politician who reached the level of Deputy Prime Minister of Australia) or Alex Cameron who had been Chairman of the District Council of Brown's Well from 1919 to 1939.

Major junctions
Cameron Highway is entirely contained within the District Council of Loxton Waikerie local government area.

References

Highways in South Australia